Raphael Schaschko (born 7 June 1985) is a German former professional footballer who played as a defender.

External links

1985 births
Living people
German footballers
Association football defenders
Germany youth international footballers
2. Bundesliga players
3. Liga players
VfB Stuttgart II players
SpVgg Unterhaching players
Chemnitzer FC players
SG Sonnenhof Großaspach players
SSV Reutlingen 05 players
People from Herrenberg
Sportspeople from Stuttgart (region)
Footballers from Baden-Württemberg